Pinky Prashant Rajgarhia is an Indian child psychologist and beauty queen who was born in Dharan, Nepal. She received the Lions Club of Mumbai Corporate "Nari Shakti Puraskar".

Early life 
Pinky Prashant Rajgarhia was born in Dharan, Nepal. She married at 19 and became pregnant, only to have a miscarriage. She took steroids and then had two daughters; her weight also increased to 88 kg. She decided to lose weight and now is 58 kg.

Career 
Rajgarhia qualified as a child psychologist at Symbiosis College in Pune and moved to Mumbai. Her daughters filled in a form for the Eastern Mrs. India 2016 beauty pageant which she proceeded to win. She then came first in the Mrs. India Fitness 2016 and Mrs. Asia 2017 competitions. In 2017 she also won the Mrs. Universe Business Lady 2017. She was awarded the Samaj Ratan in 2017 and won the Lions Club of Mumbai Corporate "Nari Shakti Puraskar". She is an ambassador for Acid Survivors Foundation India and she also promotes Beti Bachao, Beti Padhao Yojana.

References 

Indian beauty pageant winners
Indian psychologists
Year of birth missing (living people)
People from Mumbai
People from Dharan
Living people